Kwyro Lee is an electrical engineer at the Korea Advanced Institute of Science and Technology in Daejeon, South Korea. Lee was named a Fellow of the Institute of Electrical and Electronics Engineers (IEEE) in 2014 for his management and R&D efforts in semiconductor technology.

References

Fellow Members of the IEEE
Living people
Academic staff of KAIST
Year of birth missing (living people)
Place of birth missing (living people)